Hieronymus van Orley (active c. 1612) was a Franciscan painter in the Spanish Netherlands.

Van Orley was born in Brussels in 1590 and learnt the art of painting from Antonie Drua in Mechelen around 1612. Maria de Taye, abbess of Forest Abbey outside Brussels, commissioned paintings from him for the abbey church. A number of his portraits were engraved by Richard Collin and were reproduced in Jean François Foppens, Bibliotheca belgica (2 vols., Brussels, 1739).

References

1590 births
Artists from Brussels
Belgian Franciscans
Flemish Baroque painters